Watermill is a ballet choreographed by Jerome Robbins when he was balletmaster at the New York City Ballet and set to a musical piece written a year earlier by Teiji Ito (also entitled “Watermill”), with costumes by Patricia Zipprodt, lighting by Jennifer Tipton and décor by Robbins in association with Davie Reppa. The ballet premiered on Thursday, February 3, 1972, at the New York State Theater, Lincoln Center.

Original cast
Penny Dudleston
Tracy Bennett
Deni Lamont
Colleen Neary
Edward Villella
Hermes Conde
Jean-Pierre Frohlich
Bart Cook
Victor Castelli
Robert Maiorano

References 

  
Playbill, New York City Ballet, Friday, May 2, 2008 
 
Repertory Week, New York City Ballet, Spring season, 2008 repertory, week 1

Articles 

  
NY Times by Donal Henahan, February 10, 1972
NY Times by Clive Barnes, February 13, 1972
 
NY Times by Clive Barnes, May 8, 1972
NY Times by Anna Kisselgoff, June 3, 1990

Reviews 

  
NY Times by Clive Barnes, February 4, 1972
 
NY Times by Alastair Macaulay, May 5, 2008

Ballets by Jerome Robbins
New York City Ballet repertory
1972 ballet premieres
Ballets to the music of Teiji Ito
Ballets designed by Patricia Zipprodt
Ballets designed by Jennifer Tipton